In Greek mythology, Ida (Ancient Greek: Ἴδη means 'wooded mountain') or Idê was the daughter of Corybas, who gave his name to the Corybantes. Her possible mother was Thebe, daughter of Cilix. Ida married Lycastus, the king of Crete, who was the son of Minos, the first king of Crete. She bore Lycastus a son, also named Minos, who succeeded his father as the "second" king Minos of Crete.

Notes

References
 Diodorus Siculus, The Library of History translated by Charles Henry Oldfather. Twelve volumes. Loeb Classical Library. Cambridge, Massachusetts: Harvard University Press; London: William Heinemann, Ltd. 1989. Vol. 3. Books 4.59–8. Online version at Bill Thayer's Web Site
 Diodorus Siculus, Bibliotheca Historica. Vol 1-2. Immanel Bekker. Ludwig Dindorf. Friedrich Vogel. in aedibus B. G. Teubneri. Leipzig. 1888-1890. Greek text available at the Perseus Digital Library.
 Graves, Robert, The Greek Myths, Harmondsworth, London, England, Penguin Books, 1960. 
 Graves, Robert, The Greek Myths: The Complete and Definitive Edition. Penguin Books Limited. 2017. 
Grimal, Pierre, The Dictionary of Classical Mythology, Wiley-Blackwell, 1996, .

Queens in Greek mythology
Cretan characters in Greek mythology

Cretan mythology